The Midland Railway 115 Class was the third of four classes of 4-2-2 steam locomotive, nicknamed "Spinners", designed by Samuel Waite Johnson. A total of 15 of the class were built between 1896 and 1899. They were capable of reaching speeds of up to 90 miles per hour (145 km/h).. One engine, No. 673, is preserved in the National Collection.

Classes of Midland Railway 4-2-2 locomotives
Single-driver locomotives had been superseded in the late 19th century as loads increased, but were then reintroduced when steam sanding allowed better adhesion. Five similar classes were built, with slight enlargements each time, and details as follows:

Construction history
The fifteen locomotives in the 115 class were built in two batches, both at Derby Works.

Service history
It was quite common for engines of this class to pull a typical Midland express weighing , which suited the Class 115 perfectly. Speeds up to 90 mph were not uncommon, and the sight of their large, spinning driving wheels with no visible connecting rods, like a spinning wheel, earned them the nickname "Spinners". Due to the Midland's practice of building low powered locomotives and relying on double-heading to cope with heavier trains, many enjoyed working lives of up to 30 years. They made ideal pilot engines for the later Johnson/Deeley 4-4-0 classes.

Renumbering
In the Midland Railway 1907 renumbering scheme, they were assigned numbers 670–684. During World War I most were placed in store, but were then pressed into service afterwards as pilots on the Nottingham to London coal trains. Twelve locomotives survived to the 1923 grouping, keeping their Midland Railway numbers in LMS service. Nevertheless, by 1927 only three of the class remained, with the last engine, 673 (formerly 118) being withdrawn in 1928 and subsequently preserved.

Preservation 
No. 673 is the sole survivor of its class.  It was steamed around 1976–1980 when it took part in the Rainhill Trials 150th cavalcade but is currently a static exhibit in the National Railway Museum in York.

Gallery

References 

Herring, Peter (2000) Classic British Steam Locomotives, Enderby: Abbeydale, 

0115
4-2-2 locomotives
Railway locomotives introduced in 1896
Standard gauge steam locomotives of Great Britain

Passenger locomotives